Elections were held in Illinois on Tuesday, November 4, 1952.

Primaries were held on April 8.

The elections, in large part, saw a strong performance by the Republican Party.

The Republican Party retained control both chambers of the Illinois General Assembly and also won the Governorship, winning them a trifecta of state government control. They also swept all statewide elected executive offices. Additionally, they won all three seats for University of Illinois Trustees that were up for election.

For the first time since 1928, Illinois voted for the Republican presidential ticket, despite the fact that the Democratic ticket was headed by incumbent Illinois Governor Adlai Stevenson II.

Election information

Turnout
In the primary, 2,289,347 ballots were cast (891,991 Democratic and 1,397,356 Republican).

In the general election, turnout was 86.04% with a total of 4,563,305 ballots cast.

Federal elections

United States President 

Illinois voted for the Republican ticket of Dwight D. Eisenhower and Richard Nixon. They defeated the Democratic ticket of (incumbent Illinois Governor) Adlai Stevenson II and John Sparkman.

This was the first time since 1928 that Illinois had voted for the Republican presidential ticket. This came despite the fact that the Democratic ticket was headed by Stevenson.

United States House 

Illinois had redistricted before this election, and had lost one seat due to reapportionment following the 1950 United States Census. All of Illinois' remaining 25 seats in the United States House of Representatives were up for election in 1952.

Before the election Republicans held 18 seats and Democrats held 8 seats from Illinois. In 1952, Republicans won 16 seats and Democrats won 9 seats.

State elections

Governor

Incumbent Governor Adlai Stevenson II, a Democrat, ultimately did not seek a second term, instead opting to run as his party's nominee for President of the United States. Republican William Stratton was elected to succeed him in office.

General election

Lieutenant Governor

Incumbent Lieutenant Governor Sherwood Dixon, a Democrat, ultimately did not seek reelection to a second term, instead opting to run for governor. Republican John William Chapman was elected to succeed him in office.

Before being made the Democratic nominee for governor (replacing Adlai Stevenson II, who opted to instead read for president for the United States), Dixon had been running for reelection, even winning the Democratic nomination. Judge Herbert C. Paschen replaced Dixon as the Democratic nominee for lieutenant governor.

Democratic primary

Republican primary

General election

Attorney General 

 
Incumbent Attorney General Ivan A. Elliott, a Democrat running for a second term, lost to Republican Latham Castle.

Democratic primary

Republican primary

General election

Secretary of State 

The Secretary of State Edward J. Barrett, a Democrat seeking a third term, was defeated by Republican Charles F. Carpentier.

Democratic primary

Republican primary

General election

Auditor of Public Accounts 

Incumbent Auditor of Public Accounts Benjamin O. Cooper, a Democrat seeking a second term, was defeated by Republican Orville Hodge.

Democratic primary

Republican primary

General election

Treasurer 

Incumbent Treasurer William Stratton, a Republican, did not seek reelection to a second-consecutive (third overall) term, instead opting to run for governor. Republican Elmer J. Hoffman was elected to succeed him in office.

Democratic primary

Republican primary

General election

State Senate
Seats of the Illinois Senate were up for election in 1952. Republicans retained control of the chamber.

State House of Representatives
Seats in the Illinois House of Representatives were up for election in 1952. Republicans retained control of the chamber.

Trustees of University of Illinois

An election was held for three of the nine seats for Trustees of University of Illinois. All three Republican nominees won.

Republican incumbent Park Livingston was reelected to a third term. Republican incumbent Doris Holt was reelected to a second term. Joining them in being elected was fellow Republican Cushman Bissell.

Ballot measures
Five statewide ballot measures were put before the residents of Illinois in 1952.

In order for constitutional amendments (of which all but one ballot measure was) to pass, they required either two-thirds support among those specifically voting on the measure or 50% support among all ballots cast in the elections.

County Officers' Compensation Amendment
Voters approved the County Officers' Compensation Amendment, a legislatively referred constitutional amendment which amended Article X Section 10 of the 1870 Constitution of Illinois to establish rules for the compensation of county officer which stated that the compensation amount would be set by the county board and could not increase or diminish during the term of office.

Double Liability Banking Amendment
Voters approved the Double Liability Banking Amendment, a legislatively referred constitutional amendment which amended Article XI Section 6 of the 1870 Constitution of Illinois to  make it so that individual stockholders of banking institutions should not be personally liable to the creditors of the corporation.

General Banking Law Amendment
Voters approved the General Banking Law Amendment, a legislatively referred state statute which made changes to section 13 of the general banking law.

Re-election of County Officers Amendment
The Re-election of County Officers Amendment, a legislatively referred constitutional amendment which would amend Article X Section 8 of the 1870 Constitution of Illinois create new rules for the election of officers in each county, failed to pass either threshold for adoption.

Revenue Amendment
The Revenue Amendment, a legislatively referred constitutional amendment which would amend Article IX Sections 1, 2 3, 9, and 10 and repeal Section IX Section 13 to modify the power of the legislature to levy taxes, failed to reach either threshold required for adoption.

Local elections
Local elections were held.

References

 
Illinois
Adlai Stevenson II